The enzyme glycosylphosphatidylinositol diacylglycerol-lyase (EC 4.6.1.14)  catalyzes the reaction

6-(α-D-glucosaminyl)-1-phosphatidyl-1D-myo-inositol = 6-(α-D-glucosaminyl)-1D-myo-inositol 1,2-cyclic phosphate + 1,2-diacyl-sn-glycerol

This enzyme belongs to the family of lyases, specifically the class of phosphorus-oxygen lyases.  The systematic name of this enzyme class is 6-(α-D-glucosaminyl)-1-phosphatidyl-1D-myo-inositol 1,2-diacyl-sn-glycerol-lyase [6-(α-D-glucosaminyl)-1D-myo-inositol 1,2-cyclic phosphate-forming]. Other names in common use include (glycosyl)phosphatidylinositol-specific phospholipase C, GPI-PLC, GPI-specific phospholipase C, VSG-lipase, glycosyl inositol phospholipid anchor-hydrolyzing enzyme, glycosylphosphatidylinositol-phospholipase C, glycosylphosphatidylinositol-specific phospholipase C, variant-surface-glycoprotein phospholipase C, 6-(α-D-glucosaminyl)-1-phosphatidyl-1D-myo-inositol, and diacylglycerol-lyase (1,2-cyclic-phosphate-forming).

References

 
 
 

EC 4.6.1
Enzymes of unknown structure